Ghanaian Americans are an ethnic group of Americans of full or partial Ghanaian ancestry or Ghanaian immigrants who became naturalized citizen of the United States.

History

Early history
The first people to arrive from the region then known as the Gold Coast were brought as slaves via the Atlantic slave trade. Several ethnic groups such as the Akan, the Ganga or the Ga people were imported as well to the modern United States and the third of these groups appear to have an influence on the language of the Gullah people. Because Ghanaian ports were major routes for European slave traders. Captives from ethnic groups and tribes from all over West Africa were brought there to be held and sent to the New World. Most them were imported to South Carolina, Virginia and Georgia, although other places in the United States, such as Spanish Florida and French Louisiana also had many slaves of this origin.

Recent immigration
Ghanaians began arriving in the United States en masse after the 1960s and in the 1970s amidst the civil rights movement and the decolonization of Africa. In 1957, Ghana became the first African country to gain independence from colonial rule. Ghana's first president, Kwame Nkrumah, studied at American universities and worked with black American leaders for the rights of Black people around the world. Notable African-American intellectuals and activists such as W. E. B. Du Bois and Malcolm X used Ghana as a symbol of black achievement. Most of the early immigrants from Ghana to the United States were students who came to get a better education and planned on using the education acquired in the United States to better Ghana. However, many Ghanaians that migrated in the 1980s and 1990s, came to get business opportunities. In difficult economic times, the number of Ghanaians who emigrated to the United States was small. However, when these economic problems were paralyzed, they built resources for their emigration to the United States.

Population and geographic distribution

First- and second-generation Ghanaian immigrations to the U.S. make up a small portion (0.3%) of the total number of foreign-born Americans. New York City metropolitan area and Washington, D.C. metropolitan area have the highest numbers of Ghanaian immigrants. The state with the largest number of immigrants from Ghana is New York, followed by Virginia, New Jersey, and Maryland. 

The 2010 U.S. Census tallied 91,322 Ghanaian Americans living in the United States. 

The U.S. Census Bureau's American Community Survey for 2015 to 2019 estimated the total number of immigrants from Ghana in the U.S. to be 178,400. The top five counties of residence were The Bronx (19,500), Prince William County, Virginia (6,400), Franklin County, Ohio (6,400), Cook County, Illinois (5,200), Essex County, New Jersey (5,100), Montgomery County, Maryland (5,000), Worcester County, Massachusetts (4,700),  Prince George's County, Maryland (4,500), Gwinnett County, Georgia (4,100), Fairfax County, Virginia (3,300), Brooklyn (3,200), Tarrant County, Texas (2,700), Los Angeles County, California (2,500),  Middlesex County, New Jersey (2,400), and Dallas County, Texas (2,400).

Education and languages 
A 2015 report by the Migration Policy Institute noted that the educational attainment of first- and second-generation Ghanaian-Americans was similar to the overall U.S. population. About 18% of Ghanaian diaspora members in the U.S. age 25 and over had a bachelor's degree as their highest credential, compared to 20% in the overall U.S. population ages 25 and older.  About 12% of Ghanaian diaspora members had an advanced degree, compared to about 11% of the overall U.S. population.

Ghanaian Americans speak English, and often also speak Akan, Ga, Ewe  and Twi. Ghanaians have an easier time adapting to life in the United States than other immigrants because their homeland of Ghana has the English language as the official language and it is spoken by the majority of Ghana's population.

Organizations and civic life
A 2015 study identified 63 Ghanaian diaspora groups based in the U.S.; these include social groups, charitable and humanitarian organizations, and professional associations (such as the  Ghana Physicians and Nurses Association), and regional groups (such as the Ghana National Council of Chicago). Some Ghanaian American organizations are pan-ethnic, while others focus on specific ethnic backgrounds, such as Ewe, Asante, and Gadangme. Most organizations do not have full-time professional staff or large budgets; the largest Ghanaian American organization in terms of revenue was the Ashesi University Foundation, which is based on Seattle.

Notable people

Sports
Joseph Addai, former American football runningback of the National Football League
Xavier Adibi, former American football linebacker
Freddy Adu, soccer player of the Las Vegas Lights FC for the United Soccer League
Ezekiel Ansah, American football defensive end for the Detroit Lions of the National Football League
Jon Asamoah, former offensive guard for the National Football League
Larry Asante, American football safety
Joshua Clottey, professional boxer who held the IBF welterweight title from 2008-2009
Ebenezer Ekuban, American football defensive end of the National Football League for the Dallas Cowboys
Kofi Kingston
Nana Kuffour
Nazr Mohammed
Prince Nana
Akwasi Owusu-Ansah
Charlie Peprah
Robbie Russell
C. J. Sapong
Visanthe Shiancoe
Clint Sintim
Jeremy Zuttah
Orleans Darkwa
Eli Apple

Music, arts and entertainment
Virgil Abloh
Naki Akarobettoe
Rhian Benson
Michael Blackson
Sufe Bradshaw
Roseanne A. Brown 
William Chapman Nyaho
Jay Ghartey
Lance Gross
Boris Kodjoe
Kwesi Boakye
Ofie Kodjoe
Peter Mensah
Vic Mensa
Ian Jones-Quartey
Kwei Quartey
Sam Richardson
Kofi Siriboe
Moses Sumney
Rashad McCrorey

Other
Akwasi Aidoo
Desmond Daniel Amofah
Kwame Anthony Appiah
Kwabena Boahen
Joy Buolamwini
Paul Cuffee
Irene Dankwa-Mullan
Ave K. P. Kludze, Jr.
Samuel Koranteng-Pipim
Monica Owusu-Breen
Jonathan Corbblah
Emmanuel K. Akyeampong
Oral Ofori
Daniel A. Wubah

See also

 Ghanaians
 Ghana
 African immigrants to the United States
 Ghanaian Australians
 Ghanaian Canadians
 Ghanaians in Ireland
 Ghanaians in the United Kingdom
 Ghanaians in the Netherlands
 Ghanaians in Belgium
 Ghanaians in France
 Ghanaians in Germany
 Ghanaians in Switzerland
 Ghanaians in Italy
 Ghanaians in Denmark
 Ghanaians in Norway
 Ghanaians in Sweden
 Ghanaians in Poland
 Ghanaians in Spain
 Ghana–United States relations

References

Further reading
 Attah-Poku, Agyemang. The SocioCultural Adjustment Question: The Role of Ghanaian Immigrant Ethnic Associations in America (Brookfield, VT: Avebury, 1996).
 Walker, Drew. "Ghanaian Americans." Gale Encyclopedia of Multicultural America, edited by Thomas Riggs, (3rd ed., vol. 2, Gale, 2014), pp. 225–236. Online

External links
 National Council of Ghanaian Associations
   news about Ghana and Ghanaian Americans
EveryCulture — Ghanaian-Americans

West Africans in the United States